Graciella is a genus of longhorn beetles of the subfamily Lamiinae, containing the following species:

 Graciella albomaculata (Breuning, 1952)
 Graciella brunneomaculata Hintz, 1912
 Graciella circuloides Téocchi, 1997
 Graciella circulum Báguena, 1952
 Graciella compacta Jordan, 1894
 Graciella epipleuralis (Breuning, 1950)
 Graciella flavovittata Téocchi & Sudre, 2003
 Graciella mariettae Lepesme & Breuning, 1955
 Graciella moea Jordan, 1903
 Graciella nigromarginata Hintz, 1912
 Graciella pulchella (Klug, 1835)

References

Tragocephalini
Cerambycidae genera